Andrew Robiskie (born May 18, 1989) is a former American football center. He played college football at Western Illinois. He is the son of Terry Robiskie and the younger brother of former wide receiver Brian Robiskie. He is also the older brother of current Western Illinois Leathernecks wide receiver Kyle Robiskie.

Professional career
On May 14, 2013, he signed with the Oakland Raiders as an undrafted free agent. On August 25, 2013, he was waived by the Raiders.

References

External links
Oakland Raiders bio
Western Illinois Leathernecks bio

Living people
1989 births
Players of American football from Los Angeles
Oakland Raiders players
American football centers
Western Illinois Leathernecks football players